Oksana Imanalijeva (born 17 January 1990) is a Lithuanian footballer who plays as a midfielder and has appeared for the Lithuania women's national team.

Career
Imanalijeva has been capped for the Lithuania national team, appearing for the team during the 2019 FIFA Women's World Cup qualifying cycle.

References

External links
 
 
 

1990 births
Living people
Lithuanian women's footballers
Lithuania women's international footballers
Women's association football midfielders